The Ultimate Aural Orgasm is the twelfth studio album by Scooter. Two singles were released from it: "Behind the Cow" and "Lass uns tanzen". This is the first album released with new member Michael Simon. Its artwork is an homage to the 1987 album Music for the Masses by Depeche Mode.

Track listing
 "Horny in Jericho" - 2:50
 "Behind the Cow" (featuring Fatman Scoop) - 3:36
 "Does the Fish Have Chips?" - 3:25
 "The United Vibe" - 3:48
 "Lass uns tanzen" - 4:27
 "U.F.O. Phenomena" - 5:04
 "Ratty's Revenge" - 4:49
 "The Shit That Killed Elvis" (featuring Jimmy Pop and Bam Margera) - 3:55
 "Imaginary Battle" - 3:57
 "Scarborough Affair" - 4:26
 "East Sands Anthem" - 4:13
 "Love Is an Ocean" - 5:45
 "Firth of Clyde" - 4:57 bonus track, only for iTunes customers

20 Years of Hardcore bonus content

 "Behind the Cow" (Spencer & Hill Bigroom Mix)
 "Behind the Cow" (Spencer & Hill Dub Radio Edit)
 "Taj Mahal"
 "Lass Uns Tanzen" (Radio Edit)
 "Lass Uns Tanzen" (Alternative Club Mix)
 "Lass Uns Tanzen" (DJ Zany Remix)
 "Lass Uns Tanzen" (Hardwell & Greatski Late At Night Remix)
 "Lass Uns Tanzen" (Tom Novy's New HP Invent Mix)
 "Te Quiero"

Deluxe edition
The Deluxe edition of the album comes with a second CD with the following track listing. This version was released as standard in Australia as the 2 x CD Tour Edition.

 "Aiii Shot the DJ" (Missing Live Track)
 "Am Fenster" (Missing Live Track)
 "Trance Atlantic" (Special Live Version)
 "Fire" (Full Length Live Version)
 "Apache" (Flip & Fill UK Mix)
 "Behind the Cow" (3 AM Mix)
 "Behind the Cow" Making of Video
 "Behind the Cow" Video
 Photos
 Band Interview
 2-sided poster

Charts

Notes
"Behind the Cow" samples different versions of "What Time Is Love?" by The KLF, "(Don't Fear) The Reaper" by Blue Öyster Cult. It also features vocals from the song "Yeh Kali Kali", from the Indian movie "Baazigar"
"Does the Fish Have Chips?" resembles "Song 2" by Blur from their 1997 self-titled album and "Smack My Bitch Up" by The Prodigy from the 1997 album The Fat of the Land. (A previous remix of both songs was "S.M.D.U." by Brock Landers) It features lyrics from the 1972 T-Rex single "Children of the Revolution". As with Scooter's 1998 single "How Much Is the Fish?", the title is derived from lyrics in the song "Buffalo" by Anglo-Irish indie group Stump, taken from the 1986 mini-album Quirk Out.
"The United Vibe" samples Den Harrow's 1986 single "Catch the Fox" from the 1985 album Overpower.
"Lass Uns Tanzen" samples the song "Disco Band" by the Italo disco group Scotch and the lyrics of the song "Oder Beides" by German electro band Lexy & K-Paul.
"U.F.O. Phenomena" has a similar melodic theme to the song "Radioactivity" by Kraftwerk, from the 1975 album Radio-Activity.
"Ratty's Revenge" samples the Irish folk song "She Moved Through the Fair".
"The Shit That Killed Elvis" features Jimmy Pop from American rock group The Bloodhound Gang and samples the 1992 hit Born of frustration by James.
"Imaginary Battle" samples "Church of the KLF" from The KLF's 1991 album The White Room.
"Scarborough Affair" samples the traditional English ballad "Scarborough Fair".  This and "Ratty's Revenge" are both sung by Nikk, Rick Jordan's wife.
"Love Is an Ocean" samples "Ever So Lonely" by Monsoon, which was previously sampled by  RMB in their 1995 song "Love Is An Ocean".
"Trance-Atlantic (Special Live Version)" samples "Acid Air Raid" by Solar Quest.
On the "20 Years of Hardcore" re-release, the hidden cow mooing was cut from the end of "Taj Mahal".

References

2007 albums
Scooter (band) albums